"Fiction" is the debut maxi-single by Japanese rock band Coldrain, it was released on November 5, 2008.

Before this single, the band had never recorded and released other material. To help spread their name, they handed out demos of this record around Nagoya to help encourage people to go to their shows. "Fiction" was the only song off this maxi-single to be included on Coldrain's debut studio album Final Destination. However, the song was remastered for the album to produce a different sound to what it was on the maxi single version.

Later on in his career, frontman Masato Hayakawa stated that when making this record he did not think they would ever get noticed or succeed because of the quality and chemistry of them all as a band. He also stated that they were signed to a major label far too early in their lifespan.

Track listing
All lyrics written by Masato Hayakawa, all music written by Masato Hayakawa and Ryo Yokochi, except when noted.

Music video
The music video for "Fiction" was premiered and promoted on Space Shower TV a week before the release of the single on October 29, 2008. The video was directed by Suzuki Daisin.

The music video takes place in a seemingly abandoned house which follows the storyline of a man, played by frontman Masato Hayakawa, and a woman who are in a dysfunctional relationship. In the end, it is revealed that the relationship is fake, which plays into the meaning of the song. The band playing the song and jamming out is intertwined with the storyline.

As of October 2022, the music video for "Fiction" has over 550K views on YouTube.

Personnel
Credits retrieved from singles' liner notes.

Coldrain
  – lead vocals, lyricist, producer
  – lead guitar, programming, keyboards, producer, composer
  – rhythm guitar, backing vocals
  – bass guitar, backing vocals
  – drums, percussion

Additional personnel
 Koichi Hara – recording engineer, mixing
 Hokuto Fukami – assistant engineer
 Hiromichi Takiguchi – mastering (Parasight Mastering, Tokyo)

Charts

References 

Coldrain songs
2008 debut singles
2008 songs
Songs written by Masato Hayakawa
Punk rock songs